Rajesh Sudhir Gokhale (born 1967) is currently the Secretary for Department of Biotechnology (DBT), Government of India. He joined National Institute of immunology after conducting his postdoctoral training at Stanford University, He was the director of Institute of Genomics and Integrative Biology from 2009 to 2016. Gokhale is known for his studies on the metabolic diversity of pathogens. He is credited with the discovery of a family of Long-chain Fatty acyl-AMP ligases (FAAL) and his studies assisted in the elucidation of biochemical crosstalk between fatty acid synthases and polyketide synthases in Mycobacterium tuberculosis. He holds US and Indian patents for his invention of Method to Modulate Pigmentation Process in the Melanocytes of Skin. An alumnus of the Indian Institute of Science, he is an elected fellow of the Indian Academy of Sciences (2007) and the Indian National Science Academy (2014). The Council of Scientific and Industrial Research, the apex agency of the Government of India for scientific research, awarded him the Shanti Swarup Bhatnagar Prize for Science and Technology, one of the highest Indian science awards, in 2006, for his contributions to biological sciences. He received the National Bioscience Award for Career Development of the Department of Biotechnology in 2009.

References

External links 
 

Recipients of the Shanti Swarup Bhatnagar Award in Biological Science
1967 births
Indian Institute of Science alumni
20th-century Indian biologists
20th-century Indian inventors
Fellows of the Indian Academy of Sciences
Fellows of the Indian National Science Academy
Living people
N-BIOS Prize recipients
21st-century Indian inventors